The following article lists notable events during the 1894–95 season in American soccer.

Leagues

ALPF 

Organized by franchise owners of the National League of Professional Baseball Clubs, the ALFP played its only season this year.

American Cup

1894 American Cup 

 Winner: Fall River Olympics
 Finalist: Paterson True Blues

1895 American Cup 
 Winner: Newark Caledonian
 Finalist: Pawtucket Free Wanderers

References 

 
Seasons in American soccer